Tyulebayevo (Tüläbay) is a rural locality (a village) in Irtyubaksky Selsoviet, Kugarchinsky District, Bashkortostan, Russia. The population was 159 as of 2010. There are 3 streets.

Geography 
Tyulebayevo is located 19 km north of Mrakovo (the district's administrative centre) by road. Gavrilovka is the nearest rural locality.

References 

Rural localities in Kugarchinsky District